Charles Gene Abrell (August 12, 1931 – June 10, 1951) was a United States Marine Corps corporal who was killed in action during the UN May–June 1951 counteroffensive in the Korean War.

Abrell was posthumously awarded the Medal of Honor for his heroic actions and sacrifice of life on June 10, 1951, at Hwacheon, Korea while advancing under fire with his platoon against enemy hill positions. After being wounded twice during a single-handed assault against an enemy bunker, he pulled the pin from a hand grenade and hurled himself into the bunker, killing the enemy gun crew and himself in the explosion.

Biography
Charles Abrell was born in Terre Haute, Indiana in 1931. He attended public schools in Las Vegas, Nevada, and then enlisted in the Marine Corps on August 17, 1948, at age 17.

U.S. Marine Corps

Following recruit training at Marine Corps Recruit Depot Parris Island, South Carolina, Abrell was assigned as a rifleman to Marine Corps Base Camp Lejeune, North Carolina. He deployed from San Diego on August 17, 1950, to Kobe, Japan at the beginning of the Korean War aboard the attack transport USS Noble (was previously used for large scale amphibious training exercises with Marines from Camp Lejeune) with the 1st Marine Regiment, 1st Marine Division, arriving September 2. The USS Noble departed Kobe on September 9 and arrived off South Korea on September 13 for the Inchon Invasion on September 15.

He was in combat at the Battle of Inchon on September 15 to 19, 1950, Seoul, Wonsan, Chosin Reservoir and Hamhung as a fire team leader with Company E, 2nd Battalion, 1st Marine Regiment, 1st Marine Division. He died during an assault on an enemy hill position at Hwachon, Korea for which he was awarded the Medal of Honor.

Abrell is buried in the West Lawn Cemetery in Farmersburg, Indiana.

Military awards
Abrell's decorations and awards include:

Medal of Honor citation

Abrell's Medal of Honor citation reads:

The President of the United States in the name of the Congress takes pride in presenting the Medal of Honor posthumously to

CORPORAL CHARLES G. ABRELL
UNITED STATES MARINE CORPS
for service as set forth in the following

CITATION:
For conspicuous gallantry and intrepidity at the risk of his life above and beyond the call of duty while serving as a fire team leader in Company E, in action against enemy aggressor forces. While advancing with his platoon in an attack against well-concealed and heavily fortified enemy hill positions, Cpl. Abrell voluntarily rushed forward through the assaulting squad which was pinned down by a hail of intense and accurate automatic-weapons fire from a hostile bunker situated on commanding ground. Although previously wounded by enemy hand grenade fragments, he proceeded to carry out a bold, single-handed attack against the bunker, exhorting his comrades to follow him. Sustaining 2 additional wounds as he stormed toward the emplacement, he resolutely pulled the pin from a grenade clutched in his hand and hurled himself bodily into the bunker with the live missile still in his grasp. Fatally wounded in the resulting explosion which killed the entire enemy guncrew within the stronghold, Cpl. Abrell, by his valiant spirit of self-sacrifice in the face of certain death, served to inspire all his comrades and contributed directly to the success of his platoon in attaining its objective. His superb courage and heroic initiative sustain and enhance the highest traditions of the U.S. Naval Service. He gallantly gave his life for his country.

Harry S. Truman

In memory
In 1982, the Indiana Historical Bureau placed a historical marker in northern Terre Haute commemorating Abrell; it is one of twelve markers in Vigo County.

In June 2001, a life-sized bronze statue of Charles Abrell on the grounds of the Vigo County Courthouse, Indiana, was dedicated in honor of those who served in Korea.

See also

List of Korean War Medal of Honor recipients

Notes

References

1931 births
1951 deaths
American military personnel killed in the Korean War
United States Marine Corps Medal of Honor recipients
People from Terre Haute, Indiana
United States Marine Corps non-commissioned officers
Military personnel from Indiana
Korean War recipients of the Medal of Honor
Deaths by hand grenade
United States Marine Corps personnel of the Korean War